Gus Hefter (29 April 1873 – 1 February 1922) was an Australian rules footballer who played with St Kilda in the Victorian Football League (VFL).

References

External links 

1873 births
1922 deaths
Australian rules footballers from Melbourne
St Kilda Football Club players